The Emblem of Ladakh is the symbol used to represent the government of Ladakh, a region in the northern part of the Indian subcontinent currently administered by India as a union territory. It was adopted following the creation of the union territory of Ladakh on 31 October 2019.

Autonomous hill development councils

Ladakh is divided into two districts which each elect an autonomous district council. The emblems of these councils are as follows:

Historical symbols

Government banner
The administration of Ladakh can be represented by a blue banner displaying the emblem India in silver with the words "THE ADMINISTRATION OF" inscribed above in an arc and the words "UT LADAKH (INDIA)" inscribed on a straight line below both in gold.

See also
 National Emblem of India
 List of Indian state emblems

References

Government of Ladakh
Ladakh
Ladakh